, also known in Japan as Yuru Camp, is a Japanese manga series written and illustrated by Afro. Set in and around Yamanashi Prefecture, Japan, the series chronicles the adventures of Rin Shima, Nadeshiko Kagamihara, and their friends as they travel to various campsites across the country.

The manga was first serialized in Houbunsha's Manga Time Kirara Forward magazine from July 2015 to February 2019 until it was transferred to the publisher website and app for manga called Comic Fuz. It has been collected in fourteen tankōbon volumes. The manga is licensed in North America by Yen Press.

An anime television series adaptation by C-Station aired in Japan on AT-X from January to March 2018; the anime was co-financed and licensed by Crunchyroll. A short anime spin-off, titled Room Camp, aired from January to March 2020. A live action drama series aired in Japan from January to March 2020, and a second drama season aired from April to June 2021. A second anime season aired from January to April 2021, and an anime film premiered on July 1, 2022. A virtual reality video game based on the series was released in March 2021, and a visual novel developed by MAGES was released in November 2021.

A third season has been announced.

Premise
Rin Shima, a high school-aged girl, enjoys camping on her own. One day, she meets Nadeshiko Kagamihara, who encourages her to join their school's camping club. Together, Rin, Nadeshiko, and their classmates Chiaki Ōgaki and Aoi Inuyama travel around Japan, camping together and enjoying their daily lives.

Characters

Portrayed by: Yuno Ōhara
An energetic girl who befriends Rin and joins the Outdoor Activities Circle. Her surname comes from a traditional alternative form of the name of Kakamigahara, Gifu.

Portrayed by: Haruka Fukuhara
A generally quiet girl who enjoys camping by herself. Often rides her Yamaha Vino moped. Her surname comes from Shima, Mie.

Portrayed by: Momoko Tanabe
President of the Outdoor Activities Circle. Her surname comes from Ōgaki, Gifu.

Portrayed by: Yumena Yanai
Chiaki's friend and member of the Outdoor Activities Circle. Her surname comes from Inuyama, Aichi.

Portrayed by: Sara Shida
Rin's cheerful classmate. Her name comes from Ena, Gifu.

Portrayed by: Yurina Yanagi
Nadeshiko's older sister. She loves driving. Often drives her Nissan Rasheen. She is a big fan of "Moped Journey" by How Do You Like Wednesday? and owns all the DVDs of East Japan (ja), West Japan, and Overseas (ja). 

Portrayed by: Kaho Tsuchimura
A substitute teacher at Motosu High School. She became the Outdoor Activities Circle's advisor as she prefers clubs that are not busy most of the time. She drinks alcohol a lot. She is first met by Nadeshiko and Rin during their camping while she is camping with her little sister. She drives her Suzuki Hustler. Her surname comes from Toba, Mie.

Portrayed by: Honoka Kitahara
Minami's younger sister, who commonly camps with her. The Outdoor Activities Circle girls originally assume her to be a boy. She lent her Nissan Lafesta to her sister in Izu camp. 

Portrayed by: Anna Ishii
Nadeshiko's childhood friend from middle school. Often rides her Honda Ape 100. Her surname comes from Toki, Gifu.

Rin's maternal grandfather. He loves outdoor camping, and he is the one who inspired Rin to begin camping. Often rides his Triumph Thruxton 1200R and drives his Honda Acty Van in manga and anime / Toyota HiAce in drama. He first appeared in anime as the old man who camps alone who Chiaki met when she was scouting for a campsite. His voice actor is also the narrator in the anime, which could mean he is the narrator himself. His surname comes from Shinshiro, Aichi.

Rin's father. He goes to work with a moped. In the anime, he first appeared in a special OVA episode where he borrowed a three-wheeler motor scooter Yamaha Tricity as a substitute for Rin's moped which was being serviced at that time. Often drives his Subaru Forester. 

Portrayed by: Ayumi Mikata
Rin's mother. She went camping together with her husband and father (Rin's grandfather) in the past. She used to ride a Yamaha SR400. 

Portrayed by: Yūsuke Noguchi
Nadeshiko's father. He loves eating.

Portrayed by: Eiko Yamamoto
Nadeshiko's mother.

Portrayed by: Aina Nishizawa
Aoi's mischievous younger sister.

Aoi's grandmother.

Portrayed by: Jun Hashimoto
Ena's father.
 Narration

Mei's friend.

A new member of the Outdoor Activities Circle.

Media

Manga

The series began serialization in Houbunsha's Manga Time Kirara Forward magazine in July 2015 until 2019 when it was transferred to the new website and app Comic Fuz. Fourteen volumes have been released so far. Yen Press has licensed the manga for a North American release, and released the first volume of the manga in English in March 2018.

Anime

A twelve-episode anime television series adaptation, directed by Yoshiaki Kyōgoku and produced by C-Station, aired from January 4 to March 22, 2018. Jin Tanaka supervised the series' scripts and Mutsumi Sasaki designed the characters. The series was released on three Blu-ray Disc/DVD volumes between March 28 and July 25, 2018, each containing an additional OVA episode. Crunchyroll co-financed, licensed and streamed the series. The season received an English dub, which was released on Crunchyroll on August 2, 2022.

A second season, new film, and short anime were announced to be in production in October 2018. The short anime, titled Room Camp, aired from January 6 to March 23, 2020. The series is directed by Masato Jinbo, with Mutsumi Ito handling series composition, and Mutsumi Sasaki as character designer. Yoshiaki Kyōgoku is credited as supervisor, while C-Station is returning to produce the short anime. The theme song for the short series is "The Sunshower" by Asaka. A special episode was bundled with the series' Blu-ray Disc/DVD volume on May 27, 2020. The second season aired from January 7 to April 1, 2021. The opening theme song for the second season is "Seize the Day" performed by Asaka, and the ending theme song is  performed by Eri Sasaki. The film premiered in Japan on July 1, 2022, with the main staff and cast members of the television series returning.

A third season was announced in October 2022.

Live action

A live-action television adaptation of the manga was announced in November 2019. Actress Haruka Fukuhara portrays Rin Shima, with Yuno Ōhara, Momoko Tanabe, Yumena Yanai, and Sara Shida respectively playing supporting characters Nadeshiko Kagamihara, Chiaki Ōgaki, Aoi Inuyama, and Ena Saitō. The drama premiered on TV Tokyo on January 10, 2020, and its first season concluded on March 27, 2020. A special program is scheduled for broadcast on March 29, 2021, and a second season of the drama premiered on April 2, 2021.

Video games
A virtual reality video game based on the series, titled  was developed by Gemdrops. The game is described as a "virtual camping adventure" and is available in two versions, one set at Lake Motosu and another set at the Fumoto Campgrounds on Asagiri Plateau. It is available for Microsoft Windows, Nintendo Switch, PlayStation 4, iOS, and Android, and supports the Nintendo Labo VR Kit and PlayStation VR accessories. The Lake Motosu version was released on March 4, 2021, and the Fumoto Campgrounds version was released on April 7, 2021.

Characters from the series appeared alongside other Manga Time Kirara characters in the mobile RPG Kirara Fantasia in 2018, as well as in collaboration with Akatsuki's mobile baseball game Cinderella Nine in 2019, as well as in collaboration with Happy Elements's mobile role-playing game Merc Storia in 2021.

A visual novel, titled , was developed and published by MAGES, and released on PlayStation 4 and Nintendo Switch in Japan on November 11, 2021. There are no announced plans to release the game in other regions.

In February 2022, Enish announced the first mobile game for the anime series, which is set to be released that year. In November 2022, Enish delayed the game to 2023, stating that it was "for better game content and quality improvement".

Reception
The English release of the first three volumes of the manga were included on the American Library Association's list of 2019 Great Graphic Novels for Teens. The manga was also nominated for an Eisner Award in the category "Best U.S. Edition of International Material—Asia" in 2019.

In November 2019, Polygon named Laid-Back Camp as one of the best anime of the 2010s, describing it as "the ultimate comfy, slice-of-life anime", and Crunchyroll listed it in their "Top 100 best anime of the 2010s". IGN also listed Laid-Back Camp among the best anime series of the 2010s, stating that it is "a wonderful celebration of nature and friendship". Patrick Lum of The Guardian listed Laid-Back Camp as one of his best iyashikei anime series.

The anime significantly increased local tourism for the places featured, with several campgrounds reporting their number of visitors tripling.

References

External links
 List of Laid-Back Camp chapters at Comic Fuz 
 List of Laid-Back Camp volumes at Houbunsha 
 

2015 manga
2018 anime television series debuts
2020 anime television series debuts
2021 anime television series debuts
Anime series based on manga
C-Station
Camping in anime and manga
Crunchyroll anime
Houbunsha manga
Iyashikei anime and manga
Medialink
Seinen manga
Television shows set in Yamanashi Prefecture
Yen Press titles